The Virtue of Selfishness: A New Concept of Egoism is a 1964 collection of essays by the philosopher Ayn Rand and the writer Nathaniel Branden. Most of the essays originally appeared in The Objectivist Newsletter. The book covers ethical issues from the perspective of Rand's Objectivist philosophy. Some of its themes include the identification and validation of egoism as a rational code of ethics, the destructiveness of altruism, and the nature of a proper government.

Summary
The book contains 19 essays, 14 of them written by Rand and five by Branden, plus an introduction written by Rand. All but one of the essays had previously been published in The Objectivist Newsletter, a magazine that Rand and Branden had launched in 1962. The exception was the book's first essay, "The Objectivist Ethics", which was a paper Rand delivered at the University of Wisconsin during a symposium on "Ethics in Our Time". "The Objectivist Ethics" explains the foundations of Rand's ethical theory. Her other essays engage a variety of ethical topics, often challenging common perspectives on such issues as compromise and moral judgment. Branden's essays, such as "Counterfeit Individualism" and "The Psychology of Pleasure", present a more psychology-focused view of morality.

Use of the term selfishness
Rand's characterization of selfishness as a virtue, including in the title of the book, is one of its most controversial elements. Philosopher Chandran Kukathas said Rand's position on this point "brought notoriety, but kept her out of the intellectual mainstream". Rand acknowledged in the book's introduction that the term 'selfishness' was not typically used to describe virtuous behavior, but insisted that her usage was consistent with a more precise meaning of the term as simply "concern with one's own interests". The equation of selfishness with evil, Rand said, had caused "the arrested moral development of mankind" and needed to be rejected.

Critics have disputed Rand's interpretation of the term. Libertarian feminist writer Sharon Presley described Rand's use of 'selfishness' as "perversely idiosyncratic" and contrary to the dictionary meaning of the term, Rand's claims to the contrary notwithstanding. Presley believes the use of the term has caused Rand's arguments to be frequently mischaracterized. Philosophy professor Max Hocutt dismissed the phrase 'the virtue of selfishness' as "rhetorical excess", saying that "without qualification and explanation, it is too paradoxical to merit serious discussion". In contrast, philosophers Douglas J. Den Uyl and Douglas B. Rasmussen described Rand's response to the question of why she uses the term as "neither antagonistic nor defensive, but rather profound." Philosopher Chris Matthew Sciabarra said it is "debatable" whether Rand accurately described the meaning of the term, but argued that Rand's philosophical position required altering the conventional meanings of some terms in order to express her views without inventing entirely new words. Philosophy professor Stephen Hicks wrote in the Internet Encyclopedia of Philosophy that Rand's "provocative title" was matched by "an equally provocative thesis about ethics".

Publication history

The idea of creating a collection of Rand's essays initially came from Bennett Cerf of Random House, who had published two of Rand's previous books, Atlas Shrugged and For the New Intellectual. Rand proposed a collection of articles to be titled The Fascist New Frontier, after a Ford Hall Forum speech she had given criticizing the views of President John F. Kennedy. Uncomfortable with Rand's comparison of Kennedy to Adolf Hitler, Cerf asked that Rand choose a different title essay. She rejected this request and dropped Random House (as well as ending her friendship with Cerf), choosing New American Library as the publisher for her new book. The Virtue of Selfishness bore a different title and did not include her piece on Kennedy; he had been assassinated before it was released, making the point of the essay moot.

Reception
The book became one of Rand's strongest-selling works of nonfiction, selling over 400,000 copies in the first four months of its release, and over 1.35 million copies by 2014.

Rand scholar Mimi Reisel Gladstein described the collection of essays as "eclectic" and "appealing to interested nonacademic or nonspecialist readers as well as to the more serious student of Objectivism". Gladstein reported that a number of contemporary reviews compared Rand's views to existentialism.

In his book Winning Through Intimidation, self-help author Robert J. Ringer said The Virtue of Selfishness is Rand's "masterpiece".

In a public appearance, writer Christopher Hitchens said, "Though I have some respect for The Virtue of Selfishness, a collection of essays ... I don't think there's any need to have essays advocating selfishness among human beings. I don't know what your impression has been, but some things require no further reinforcement."

References

Works cited

External links

1964 non-fiction books
American essay collections
Books by Ayn Rand
Books critical of Christianity
Books with atheism-related themes
English-language books
Ethics books
Collaborative non-fiction books
Objectivist books
New American Library books